Phagun is a 1973 Hindi film written and directed by Rajinder Singh Bedi, and starring Dharmendra, Waheeda Rehman, Jaya Bhaduri and Vijay Arora as leads.

This offbeat romantic drama has memorable songs by S.D. Burman and Majrooh Sultanpuri (Lyrics), including the perennial favourite Holi song, 'Piya sang khelo hori phagun aayo re' – Lata Mangeshkar.

Plot
The film has a Maharashtrian backdrop with many characters speaking Marathi dialogues and are in Marathi costumes. Shanta Damle (Waheeda Rehman), who belongs to rich Maharashtrian business family, falls in love and marries, a not so well off writer, Gopal (Dharmendra), much to her family's dismay.

Later during the pivotal song, 'Piya sang khelo hori phagun aayo re', Gopal who has been away, surprises her by putting Holi colour over her, Shanta immediately rebukes him, for spoiling her silk saree, only to please her disapproving parents. But Gopal having been publicly humiliated leaves home, never to return. Phagun, the month in which festival Holi is celebrated, had changed forever  for Shanta.

Shanta is now left to raise their daughter, Santosh 'Toshi''' alone, who grows up to be a bright young woman (Jaya Bhaduri). Santosh falls in love with Dr. Suman (Vijay Arora) and marries him.

At some point, Shanta moves in with them for while, and soon her presence starts interfering in the marriage of the young couple, who try hard to adjust with her, but it only creates tension in their marriage. Shanta's loneliness, and her growing affection for her son-in-law, soon reminds her of the fact that how much does she miss male company, this only adds to her trouble and guilt.

In the end, she begs that she be reunited with her husband, after all these years, and Gopal returns, and they are reunited.

Cast
 Dharmendra - Gopal Waheeda Rehman - Shanta Damle Jaya Bhaduri - Santosh 'Toshi' Vijay Arora - Dr. Suman Om Prakash - Dr. M.K. Effendi''
 V. Gopal

Soundtrack
Music: Sachin Dev Burman, Lyrics: Majrooh Sultanpuri

 Piya sang khelo hori phagun aayo re - Lata Mangeshkar
 Sandhya jo aaye man ud jaaye jaane re kahaan - Lata Mangeshkar
 Kab maane o dil ke mastaane - Asha Bhonsle, Kishore Kumar
 Doosro na koi mero to girdhar gopal doosro na - Usha Mangeshkar
 Bedardi ban gaye koi jaao manaao more saiyyaan - Shobha Gurtu
 Laali mere laal ki jit dekhoo tit laal  - Kishore Kumar, Pankaj Mitra

References

External links
 

Films scored by S. D. Burman
1973 films
1970s Hindi-language films
Films directed by Rajinder Singh Bedi